Hinton Glacier is a tributary glacier in the Britannia Range of Antarctica, flowing north between Forbes Ridge and Dusky Ridge into Hatherton Glacier. It was named by the Advisory Committee on Antarctic Names for U.S. Navy chief construction mechanic Clarence C. Hinton, Jr., who wintered at McMurdo Station in 1963, and headed a team charged with the maintenance of mechanical equipment at the outlying U.S. stations.

References

Glaciers of Oates Land